Kayempur is a village located in Khamarpara union, Khansama Upazila, Dinajpur District in the division of Rangpur, Bangladesh.

Demographics 
The population is about 5500.

Urbanization 

About 50% of the population in village does not have mains electricity supply.
There is a post office named 'Kayempur Post Office' with a post code of 5230.

Van, Bicycle, Motorcycle are the main forms of transportation used within the village.

Education system 

There are government primary schools (e.g. Kayempur Government primary School),  a high school (Kayempur High School), an Eptedai Madrsha (Kayempur Eptedai Madrsha), a Dakhil Madrsha (Kayempur Dakhil Madrsha) and also an NGO school in Kayempur. Literacy rates have been increasing with time (Total: 76.8%, male: 81.3%, female: 72.2%). The school drop-out rate is near zero.

Water system 
Tube well water is used.

See also 
 Khansama
 Dinajpur

References

External links
 Khamarapara Union Government website
 DC Dinajpur Government Website

Populated places in Rangpur Division